Men and Women was a glossy supplement that goes free with the Sunday issue of  The Times of India (the Sunday issue was also referred to as Sunday Times). It has now been discontinued and replaced by the current supplement Times Life.

References

Defunct magazines published in India
Free magazines
Magazines with year of establishment missing
Magazines with year of disestablishment missing
Newspaper supplements
Sunday magazines
The Times of India